Simion Furdui (born 9 July 1963) is a Moldovan politician former member of the Moldovan Parliament.

He has been a member of the Parliament of Moldova since 2009 until 2014.

References

1963 births
Living people
Liberal Democratic Party of Moldova MPs
Moldovan MPs 2009–2010
Moldovan MPs 2010–2014